Hermitage School District may refer to:

Hermitage School District (Arkansas)
Hermitage School District (Pennsylvania)